Armando Padilla (born 27 August 1956) is a Nicaraguan sprinter. He competed in the men's 100 metres at the 1976 Summer Olympics.

References

1956 births
Living people
Athletes (track and field) at the 1976 Summer Olympics
Nicaraguan male sprinters
Olympic athletes of Nicaragua
Place of birth missing (living people)